Giovanni Migliorati (24 August 1942 – 12 May 2016) was a Roman Catholic bishop.

Ordained to the priesthood in 1969, Migliorati served as Vicar Apostolic of Awasa, Ethiopia from 2009 until his death in 2016. Migliorati was born in Italy.

Notes

1942 births
2016 deaths
21st-century Roman Catholic bishops in Ethiopia
Italian Roman Catholic bishops in Africa
Roman Catholic bishops of Awasa